Peḷḷuno (Spanish name: Pelúgano) is one of 18 parishes (administrative divisions)  in Aller, a municipality within the province and autonomous community of Asturias, in northern Spain. 

Villages
 Les Bolgueres
 El Barrobaxo
 El Barrocima
 La Barrosa
 La Bárzana
 El Cabenu
 La Casabaxo
 La Cascaya
 El Castiiḷḷu
 El Coḷḷéu
 Cueves
 Cueves de Baxo
 Cueves de Cima
 Entepenes
 Peḷḷuno
 El Pendu la Tabla
 El Vaḷḷe
 La Vaḷḷina
 El Yenu

References

Parishes in Aller